Mike Huether is an American philanthropist and politician from South Dakota. He was the mayor of Sioux Falls from 2010 to 2018.

Personal life and education 
Huether was born in Yankton, South Dakota in 1962. In 1984, he attended South Dakota State University and acquired a commercial economics degree. He is married to his wife, Cindy, and has 1 daughter.

Charity work 
The Huether family runs a charity called "The Mike Cindy and Kylie Huether Family Foundation."

References

American philanthropists
Living people
Mayors of Sioux Falls, South Dakota
South Dakota State University alumni
South Dakota Democrats
South Dakota Independents
1962 births